Jati Umra may refer to:

Jati Umra (Amritsar), a village in Punjab, India.
Jati Umra (Lahore), a village in Punjab, Pakistan.